Thomas or Tom Elliott may refer to:

 Thomas Elliott (footballer) (1890–?), English footballer
 Thomas Elliott (Australian cricketer) (1879–1939), Australian cricketer
 Thomas Elliott (New Zealand cricketer) (1867–?), New Zealand cricketer
 C. Thomas Elliott (born 1939), British scientist, known as Tom Elliott
 Thomas Elliott (RAF officer) (1898–?), World War I British flying ace
 Thomas Renton Elliott (1877–1961), British physician and physiologist
Sir Thomas Elliott, 1st Baronet, English civil servant
 Tom Elliott (politician) (born 1963), Northern Irish MP
 Tom Elliott (footballer, born 1990), English footballer
 Tom Elliott (Australian footballer) (1901–1974), former Australian rules footballer
 Tom Elliott (radio personality) (born 1967), Australian radio presenter and former investment banker
 Thomas Jane (born 1969), actor born Thomas Elliott III

See also
 Thomas Eliot (disambiguation)